The 1941 North Carolina Tar Heels football team was an American football team that represented the University of North Carolina as a member of the Southern Conference during the 1941 college football season. In their sixth year under head coach Raymond Wolf, the Tar Heels compiled a 3–7 record (2–4 against conference opponents), finished 11th in the Southern Conference, and were outscored by a total of 172 to 130. The team played its home games at Kenan Memorial Stadium in Chapel Hill, North Carolina.

Three North Carolina players were selected by the United Press (UP) or the Associated Press (AP) for the 1941 All-Southern Conference football team: tackle Dick Steck (AP-2, UP-2); center Carl Suntheimer (AP-3); and back Harry Dunkle (AP-3).

Coach Wolf left the school in March 1942 to join the United States Navy.

Schedule

References

North Carolina
North Carolina Tar Heels football seasons
North Carolina Tar Heels football